Napoleon in the Wilderness is a 1941 surrealist painting by Max Ernst in the collection of the Museum of Modern Art in New York City.

References

1941 paintings
Surrealist paintings
Paintings by Max Ernst
Paintings of Napoleon
Paintings in the collection of the Museum of Modern Art (New York City)